In an adversarial process, for instance a court proceeding, a surrebuttal is a response to the opposing party's rebuttal; in essence it is a rebuttal to a rebuttal.

References

Evidence law
Legal terminology